The X Corps of the Ottoman Empire (Turkish: 10 ncu Kolordu or Onuncu Kolordu) was one of the corps of the Ottoman Army. It was formed in the early 20th century during Ottoman military reforms.

Formation

Order of Battle, 1911 
With further reorganizations of the Ottoman Army, to include the creation of corps level headquarters, by 1911 the X Corps was headquartered in Erzincan. The Corps before the First Balkan War in 1911 was structured as such:

X Corps, Erzincan
30th Infantry Division, Erzincan
88th Infantry Regiment, Erzincan
89th Infantry Regiment, Erzincan
90th Infantry Regiment, Erzincan
30th Rifle Battalion, Yemen
30th Field Artillery Regiment, Erzincan
30th Division Band, Erzincan
31st Infantry Division, Erzincan
91st Infantry Regiment, Siirt
92nd Infantry Regiment, Bitlis
93rd Infantry Regiment, Sivas
31st Rifle Battalion, Erzincan
31st Division Band, Erzincan
32nd Infantry Division, Ma'murat-ül Aziz
94th Infantry Regiment, Diyâr-ı Bekir
95th Infantry Regiment, Ma'murat-ül Aziz
96th Infantry Regiment, Dersim
32nd Rifle Battalion, Erzıncan
32nd Field Artillery Regiment, Erzincan
32nd Division Band, Ma'murat-ül Aziz
Units of IX Corps
19th Cavalry Regiment, Erzincan
20th Cavalry Regiment, Diyâr-ı Bekir
9th Engineer Battalion, Erzincan
9th Transport Battalion, Erzincan
Medical Detachment, Erzincan

Balkan Wars

Order of Battle, January 7, 1913 
On January 7, 1913, the Provisional X Corps was structured as follows:

X Corps
31st Division
32nd Division
Mamuretülaziz Redif Division
30th Field Artillery Regiment
Independent Schneider Artillery Battalion
Mountain Howitzer Battalion
5th Cavalry Regiment
Tribal Cavalry Division
Trains and Ammunition Columns

Order of Battle, March 25, 1913 
On March 25, 1913, the corps was structured as follows:

X Corps (Thrace, under the command of the Chataldja Army)
4th Division, 31st Division
Amasya Redif Division
Independent Cavalry Brigade

Order of Battle, July 1913 
X Corps (Gallipoli Army)
4th Division, 31st Division, Aziz Infantry Division

World War I

Order of Battle, August 1914, November 1914, ate April 1915, Late Summer 1915, January 1916, August 1916 
In November 1914, Late April 1915, Late Summer 1915, January 1916, August 1916, the corps was structured as follows:

X Corps (Caucasus)
30th Division, 31st Division, 32nd Division

Sources

Corps of the Ottoman Empire
Military units and formations of the Ottoman Empire in World War I
History of Erzincan
1911 establishments in the Ottoman Empire